The All-Ireland Senior Hurling Championship is an annual hurling competition established by the Gaelic Athletic Association in 1887. The All-Ireland Championship is open to the top hurling teams in Ireland, with 14 teams currently participating. Originally, only the county club champions of their respective county championships were allowed to participate. However, this was changed in the 1890s when teams involving non-county championship-winning players began to emerge. Tipperary, represented by Thurles Sarsfields, won the inaugural championship, beating Galway, represented by Meelick, in the 1887 final.

The prize for the All-Ireland champions is the Liam MacCarthy Cup.

Kilkenny hold the record for the most victories, winning the competition thirty-six times since its inception. They have also won the competition the most times in-a-row, winning it four times from 2006 to 2009, a record they share with Cork who won it four times from 1941 to 1944. Kilkenny have also been runners-up the most times, losing the final twenty-five times. The province of Munster has provided the most champions, with seventy-one wins between all six counties.

The current champions are Limerick, who beat Kilkenny in the 2022 final at Croke Park.

Finals

See also
 List of All-Ireland Senior Football Championship finals

Notes

References

Winners